Airpower is a type of military strength.

Airpower or Air Power may also refer to:

 AirPower (charging mat), a cancelled wireless charging mat developed by Apple Inc.
 Air Power (TV series), a 1950s historical educational TV series 
 Air Power (video game), 1995

See also 

 Air and Space Power Journal, formerly Airpower Journal
 Wind power